Eve Pancharoen (7 August 1981), well known by her stage name Palmy, is a Thai pop singer who has recorded and released several albums including concert DVDs on the GMM Grammy label, beginning with her self-titled solo debut, Palmy, in 2001. Palmy has explored a variety of popular music styles on each of her four solo albums, and she has collaborated with the Thai ska band T-Bone to create experimental renditions of her hits (see Flower Power Concert and The Acoustic Album.) Though her solo recording was Beautiful Ride in 2006, she has continued to perform live with T-Bone, and has appeared as a guest vocalist at other concerts and music festivals. She is primarily successful in Asia, especially Japan, Korea, Singapore and Thailand, but she has also performed in Australia and the United Kingdom. She is of Belgian, Mon and Thai descent. Palmy is known to perform and make public appearances barefoot; she even has a barefoot-themed concert (Palmy Barefoot Acoustic Concert).

Biography

Early years
Palmy was born Eve Pancharoen on 7 August 1981 to a Thai of Mon descendant mother and a Belgian father. She was raised for 12 years in Bangkok and then moved to Sydney, Australia for five years. Palmy returned to Bangkok when she was 18 years old. Palmy became interested in music while she was studying her primary level at Pra Mae Marie (St. Louise) – a Catholic school- in Bangkok. She was selected as a guitarist of music band of the school for two years. After moving to Sydney, Palmy attended Holy Cross College to study music and art. Palmy used singing as a medium to practice her English at that time. Palmy also took singing lessons at Australian Institute of Music to improve her singing skills. She was a solo singer for school graduation concert with her close friend playing classical piano at her school's church. It was surprising for those attending the concert and they convinced that she should have a career in music industry. Palmy realized that she was passionate about music and that she wanted to become a professional singer.

Return to Thailand
Palmy returned to Thailand with a determination to be a professional singer. She went for an audition at GMM Grammy. With her unique talent, Palmy signed the contract with GMM Grammy in 2000. Palmy released her first album 'Palmy' in December 2001 which made a total hit. Palmy became a well-known artist in a very short time from her first released single 'Yak Rong Dang Dang'. It was Palmy's official start in Thai music industry. Her tracks top many music charts. With this enormous success beyond expectation, Palmy had her first concert organized by GMM Grammy on 7 April 2002.

Music career
Besides her achievements of the three solo albums, Palmy has performed in several occasions overseas such as Japan, Korea, Singapore, England and Australia. Palmy was the only Thai artist performing at MTV's Asia Awards 2003 in Singapore. Palmy also held 2 big concerts in Japan: Palmy's first Live in Japan at Shibuya O-East, Tokyo on 10 June 2004 and Palmy Live in Tokyo Vol. 2 on 13 November 2006. Palmy also performed at RHB Singapore Cup Final at Singapore National Stadium and again in Singapore, she performed at Euphoria 2004 in the same event as Michael Learns to Rock and All4One. In addition, Palmy was chosen as the only Thai artist performing at "Asia Song Festival" at the Olympics Park, Seoul Korea. She held 'Palmy Live Concert in London 2006 at Indigo O2 Arena and in 2007, Palmy performed Palmy's First Live at Sydney Concert at The Metro Theatre.

Awards
 2001 Most Popular New Artist, Channel [V] Thailand Music Video Awards 2001
 2002 Female Singer, Elle Style Awards 2002 Elle (Thailand) Magazine
 2002 Best of Thai Female Pop Song, Music Society of Thailand
 2002 "Best Female Pop Singer – Golden Ganesha Award", Music Society of Thailand under the Royal Patronage
 2002 "Best Thai Female Music Video Award (Yak Rong Dang Dang)", Channel [V] Thailand Music Video Awards
 2002 Best Female Singer for National Youth, National Youth Bureau (NYB)
 2003 Best Female Singer for National Youth, National Youth Bureau (NYB)
 2003 Best Female Singer, Sea-Son Award
 2003 "Best Female Artist", Kom Chad Luek Awards
 2003 Best Thai female Music Video (Pood Mai Tem Pak), Channel [V] Thailand Music Video Awards III
 2004 "Female Artist of The Year" from Album "Stay", Fat Awards#2 (Fat radio Fm 104.5)
 2004 "MGA Top Selling Newcomer", MGA Hall of Fame Awards
 2006 "Popular Vote Female Artist", Virgin Hitz  Awards ( Virgin hitz Fm95.5)
 2007 " Female Artist of The Year ", From Album" Beautiful Ride", Fat Awards#5 (Fat Radio Fm 104.5)
 2011 "Seventeen Music female Artist" Seventeen Teen Choice Awards 2011
 2011 "No.1 Music Chart Monthly Award 2011( August2011) " KID MARK" Song (เพลง คิดมาก), Intensive watch Award 
 2011 " Best Female Artist " 10th HAMBURGER: THE DECADE OF FAME (Hamburger Magazine)
 2012 "Favorite Female Artist" You2play Award 2011 
 2012 " Best Female Artist " 1st Decade Anniversary Awards 2011 ( The Guitar Magazine) 
 2012 " Best Female Artist of the Year " Seed Awards#7 ( SEED Fm 97.5)
2012 " Best Female Artist " Siamdara Stars Awards 2012 
2012 " Female Artist of the year " From Album" Five" Fat Awards#10  (Fat radio Fm 104.5) 
2019 " Song of 2018 (Son-Klin) " ( DONT Journal Awards)
2019 " Best Entertainment on Social Media (Female Artist) " From Thailand Zocial Awards 2019
2019 " Best Song Writer of the year " (The Guitar Magazine)
2019 " Single Hit of the year (Son-Klin) " (The Guitar Magazine)
2019 " Best Female of the year " (The Guitar Magazine)
2019 " Best Female Artist " From Single Son-Klin (Kom Chad Luek Awards 15th)
2019 " Best Song of the year (Mae-Giew) " (Kom Chad Luek Awards 15th)

Discography

Palmy
The music from her self-titled debut album, Palmy was released on 21 December 2001.

The album contains ten songs :-
 "Yark rong dang dang" (อยากร้องดังดัง)
 "Yoo tor dai reu plow" (อยู่ต่อได้หรือเปล่า)
 "Paed mong chao wan ang kan" (แปดโมงเช้าวันอังคาร)
 "Kao leum" (เขาลืม)
 "Tob tuan" (ทบทวน)
 "Klua" (กลัว)
 "Peun tee suan tua" (พื้นที่ส่วนตัว)
 "San sa bai" (แสนสบาย)
 "Fah song chan ma" (ฟ้าส่งฉันมา)
 "Fan dee kae mai kee keun" (ฝันดีแค่ไม่กี่คืน)

Stay
"Her second album, Stay, was released on 29 July 2003. On this album, she has a guest artist, Jug Chawin Chitsomboon, who wrote and played the acoustic guitar in the song "Stay".

The ten songs on this album are:-
 "Tam pen mai tak" (ทำเป็นไม่ทัก)
 "Pood mai tem pak" (พูดไม่เต็มปาก)
 "Trid sa dee" (ทฤษฎี)
 "Chuay ma rub chan tee" (ช่วยมารับฉันที)
 "Ched ta na" (เจตนา)
 "Kra dod keun fah" (กระโดดขึ้นฟ้า)
 "Prung née art mai mee chan" (พรุ่งนี้อาจไม่มีฉัน)
 "Kor pai kon diaw" (ขอไปคนเดียว)
 "Ni tan" (นิทาน)
 "Stay"

Beautiful Ride
The third album, 3 years after the second one, was released on 6 June 2006. After struggling with the old production team, Palmy had a new production team and spent almost 2 years to produce the album.

The ten songs on the album are:-
 "Tick Tock"
 "Ooh!"
 "Kwam cheb puad" (ความเจ็บปวด)
 "Rong hai ngai ngai kab ruang derm derm" (ร้องไห้ง่ายง่ายกับเรื่องเดิมเดิม)
 "Mai mee kam cham kad kwam" (ไม่มีคำจำกัดความ)
 "Chak kan trong née" (จากกันตรงนี้)
 "Kun chae tee hai pai" (กุญแจที่หายไป)
 "Ploy" (ปล่อย)
 "Mai mee krai chok rai ta lod" (ไม่มีใครโชคร้ายตลอด)
 "Neung na tee" (หนึ่งนาที) ["Just One Minute"]

Palmy meets T-bone
This album is a cooperation of Palmy and T-bone, a Thai reggae band.

The twelve songs on the album are:-
 "Tick Tock"
 "Ooh!"
 Stay
 "Kwam cheb puad" (ความเจ็บปวด)
 "Kun chae tee hai pai" (กุญแจที่หายไป)
 "Klua" (กลัว)
 "Tob tuan" (ทบทวน)
 "Pood mai tem pak" (พูดไม่เต็มปาก)
 "Prung née art mai mee chan" (พรุ่งนี้อาจไม่มีฉัน)
 "Rong hai ngai ngai kab ruang derm derm" (ร้องไห้ง่ายง่ายกับเรื่องเดิมเดิม)
 "Yark rong dang dang" (อยากร้องดังดัง)
 "Yoo tor dai reu plow" (อยู่ต่อได้หรือเปล่า)

Palmy 5
Palmy 5, her fourth album, was released on 9 December 2011.

The ten songs on the album are:-
 "Rockstar syndrome"
 "Ka Ka Ka" (กา กา กา)
 "Kid mark" (คิดมาก)
 "Shy boy"
 "Crush feat. Erlend Øye" Erlend Øye"
 "Cry Cry Cry" 
 "Toong see dum" (ทุ่งสีดำ)
 "Nalika reun kao" (นาฬิกาเรือนเก่า)
 "Butterfly"
 "Private sky (demo version)"

New Single (2018-2020) 

 Nuad (นวด)
 Mae-Giew (แม่เกี่ยว)
 Son-Klin (ซ่อนกลิ่น)
 Kid-Tueng (คิดถึง)
 Doung-Jai (ดวงใจ)
 Kwang (เคว้ง) "The Stranded" TV series on Netflix)
 Kwanxey Kwanma (ขวัญเอย ขวัญมา)
 Ribbon love color black (ริบบิ้นเลิฟคัลเลอร์แบล็ค)
 Sanitjai (สนิทใจ) OST.Rakray (รักร้าย)

Concerts

Palmy's Life Concert 
This is the first concert in her life, her debut. After her tracks were the no.1 on so many music charts, the tickets were sold out within an hour. The concert was at Thammasat university auditorium at Tha-prachan campus on 7 April 2002.

Under the concept Palmy's life, After the concert, she became such a trend-setter. Palmy had a big influence on lifestyle, clothes, songs for fans.

Stay with Me
After her 2-year pause, she came back and had her second concert at Impact Arena. Most songs played in this concert were from her second album.

The name of this concert means she was still in music industry.

Palmy in the Candle Light Concert
A romantic concert under hundreds candles' light, she was the most artistically beautiful artist of the era. It took place at Vachirabenchatat Park (known as Rot fai Park).  This concert was in May in the same year with the Stay with Me concert and she invited 'Pu Anchalee Jongkadeekij' – one of the greatest Thai rock artists in the '90s – as her guest.

The Rhythm of the Times
This concert was held at the IMPACT Arena, 11,000 seating capacity concert hall, located in Bangkok, Thailand on 5 August 2006.  Special guests included T-Bone and Sena-Hoi.

Palmy Meets T-Bone in Flower Power Concert
Held in the smaller and more intimate Moon Star Studio located in Bangkok, Thailand on 2 and 3 June in 2007, Palmy with T-bone performed remixed versions of her popular songs putting a unique reggae and ska. Palmy also delivered a standout performance with her cover of "Leaving on a Jet Plane" by John Denver. Special guest, Peter Corp Dyrendal, appeared to perform a song with T-Bone and Palmy.

Palmy Ka Ka Ka Concert
After been on the break for the last 5 years . She is back  showing her Album concert  and she invited special guest that she invited to sing one of the songs in the album  Erlend Øye (Kings of Convenience  one of  an indie folk-pop duo from Bergen, Norway), Hugo (ฮิวโก้ จุลจักร จักรพงษ์) and Sena Hoi (เสนาหอย เกียรติศักดิ์ อุดมนาค) take place at Impact Arena on January 28 and 29, 2012

Palmy performing with others
Palmy is not often seen in general public events. However, she chooses to perform with selected artists she admires.

Micro's 'Put the Right Hand in the Right Concert (คอนเสิร์ตตำนานมือขวา) 
This concert of Micro – a famous rock band – was held at Impact Arena, Bangkok on 12–14 December 2003. Palmy was also a featured guest.

Bird Son Bird Sek Concert (คอนเสิร์ตเบิร์ดซนเบิร์ดเสก) 
Thongchai McIntyre or Bird Thongchai is all-time Thai pop singer along with Seksan Sukpimai (Sek Loso), rock & roll singer and songwriter held their concert for special album on 5–6 June 2004 at Impact Arena. Palmy was also a guest performing in this concert.

Hug Siaw Concert (คอนเสิร์ตฮักเสี่ยว) 
A country song artist, Poo Pongsit Kumpee, invited Palmy to his concert held at the Main Auditorium, Thammasat University, Tha-Prachan on 22 November 2008.

Groove My Dog Unplugged Concert 
Palmy performed with Moderndog – the famous Thai alternative band – and Groove Riders – the famous disco band, on 26 December 2008 at Thunder Dome Muang Thong Thani.

Touch Me Concert 
Neung Jakkawal Saothongyuttithum, one of the top pianists in Thailand, also invited Palmy to perform in his concert on 15 August 2009 at Indoor Stadium, Hua Mak.

Moderndog 5-3-15 Concert 
Palmy was invited as a guest for the alternative band, Moderndog's 15-year anniversary concert on 2–3 October 2009.

Asa Sanook Encore Plus Concert 
Palmy was invited as a guest for Bird Thongchai McIntyre, for his Asa Sanook Encore Plus Concert, in August 2011.

Hugo Under City Lights Concert 
Palmy was invited as a guest for Hugo, for his Under City Lights Concert, in October 2015. She performed "Hailstorms", "Ring of Fire" in duet with Hugo, and "Wake Alone" solo.

References

External links
Palmy on YouTube
Palmy on Instagram
Palmy on iTunes
 
  
 

21st-century Thai women singers
Thai pop singers
Living people
1981 births
People from Bangkok
Thai people of Belgian descent
Thai people of Mon descent